Santite (KB5O8·4H2O) is a hydrated borate mineral of potassium found in Tuscany, Italy. It is named for Georgi Santi (1746–1823), a former director of the Museum of Natural History, Italy.

References

External links 

Webmineral.com - Santite
Handbook of Mineralogy - Santite

Potassium minerals
Nesoborates
Orthorhombic minerals
Minerals in space group 41